Events from the year 1945 in Sweden

Incumbents
 Monarch – Gustaf V
 Prime Minister – Per Albin Hansson

Events

 18 January – The disappearance of the spy Jane Horney.
 29 January – The Swedish Institute is founded.

Births

 1 March – Svenne Hedlund
 25 April – Björn Ulvaeus, Swedish musician
3 June – Bernt Frilén, orienteering competitor, world champion 1974 (d. 2019).

Deaths

 4 January - Ellen Hartman, actress (born 1860)
 5 February – Ragnar Östberg, architect 
 22 June – Frida Stéenhoff, author (born 1865)

References

 
Years of the 20th century in Sweden
Sweden